Alex Christie may refer to:

 Alex Christie (footballer, born 1873) (1873–?), Scottish footballer
 Alex Christie (footballer, born 1896) (1896–1981), Scottish footballer

See also
Alexander Christie (disambiguation)